Emir Bihorac (born 19 July 1982) is a Serbian football midfielder of Bosniak origin.

Born in Novi Pazar (SR Serbia, SFR Yugoslavia), he played most of his career in his birth-town club FK Novi Pazar which he joined in 1993, He joined FK Vojvodina where he played between 2002 and 2005 in the First League of Serbia and Montenegro.  He also with FK ČSK Čelarevo and in Sweden, with Varbergs GIF.

References

External links
 Profile and stats at Srbijafudbal
 Profile at Playerhistory
 Profile and stats until 2003 at Dekisa.Tripod
 

Living people
1982 births
Sportspeople from Novi Pazar
Bosniaks of Serbia
Serbian footballers
FK Novi Pazar players
FK Vojvodina players
FK ČSK Čelarevo players
Expatriate footballers in Sweden
Association football midfielders